Wallis Hensman Clark (2 March 1882 – 14 February 1961) was an English stage and film actor.

Biography
Clark was born in Bolton, Lancashire, England, the son of William Wallis Clark (1854 - 1930), an engineer. Prior to acting, Clark was an engineer. He began his stage career in Margate, Kent, in 1908. He moved to the United States and acted in numerous plays on the stage, including at the Little Theatre in Philadelphia, for years before moving on to the screen in 1932.

He appeared in supporting roles in 136 films between 1931 and 1954. Five of these films won Best Picture: It Happened One Night (1934), Mutiny on the Bounty (1935), The Great Ziegfeld (1936), You Can't Take It with You (1938), and Gone with the Wind (1939). In four of these five films, Clark was uncredited. In Mutiny on the Bounty, he is credited in the role of Morrison.

Selected filmography

 Elusive Isabel (1916) - Prince D'Abruzzi
 20,000 Leagues Under the Sea (1916) - Pencroft
 Cy Whittaker's Ward (1917) - Bailey
 Hell's House (1932) - Judge Robinson
 The Final Edition (1932) - Police Commissioner Jim Conroy (uncredited)
 Alias the Doctor (1932) - Dr. Kleinschmidt (uncredited)
 Disorderly Conduct (1932) - Police Lieutenant (uncredited)
 Shopworn (1932) - Mr. Dean (uncredited)
 The Famous Ferguson Case (1932) - Lindsay Jamison (uncredited)
 Attorney for the Defense (1932) - Crowell
 My Pal, the King (1932) - Dr. Lorenz
 The Night Mayor (1932) - Crandall (uncredited)
 Okay, America! (1932) - Bit Role (uncredited)
 Big City Blues (1932) - Chief of Police (uncredited)
 The Night of June 13 (1932) - Defense Attorney (uncredited)
 Washington Merry-Go-Round (1932) - Carl Tilden (uncredited)
 Hidden Gold (1932) - Jones
 I Am a Fugitive from a Chain Gang (1932) - Chicago Lawyer (uncredited)
 If I Had a Million (1932) - Mr. Monroe - Bank Executive (uncredited)
 Forbidden Trail (1932) - Cash Karger
 Call Her Savage (1932) - Detective (uncredited)
 No Man of Her Own (1932) - Thomas Laidlaw (uncredited)
 They Just Had to Get Married (1932) - Fairchilds
 Madame Butterfly (1932) - Comm. Anderson
 The Match King (1932) - Erickson's Associate (uncredited)
 Luxury Liner (1933) - Dr. Veith
 Mystery of the Wax Museum (1933) - Autopsy Surgeon's Assistant (uncredited)
 42nd Street (1933) - Dr. Chadwick (uncredited)
 Private Jones (1933) - Bit Part (uncredited)
 The World Gone Mad (1933) - Dist. Atty. Avery Henderson
 The Working Man (1933) - Mike - the Auditor (uncredited)
 The Kiss Before the Mirror (1933) - Public Prosecutor
 Double Harness (1933) - Postmaster General
 Tugboat Annie (1933) - Second Banker (uncredited)
 Lady for a Day (1933) - Commissioner (uncredited)
 Bureau of Missing Persons (1933) - Mr. Paul
 I Loved a Woman (1933) - Banker (uncredited)
 Police Car 17 (1933) - Lt. Dan Regan
 Ever in My Heart (1933) - Enoch Sewell (uncredited)
 Female (1933) - Board Member (uncredited)
 The World Changes (1933) - Mr. Freddie McCord - Clerk
 King for a Night (1933) - Judge (uncredited)
 The Meanest Gal in Town (1934) - Mr. Bowen - Barbershop Customer (uncredited)
 Massacre (1934) - Cochran
 Beloved (1934) - Yates
 I've Got Your Number (1934) - Mr. Madison
 A Woman's Man (1934) - Ralph Mallon - Studio Chief
 It Happened One Night (1934) - Lovington (uncredited)
 The Crime Doctor (1934) - Judge Mallory
 Men in White (1934) - Mr. Smith (uncredited)
 The Line-Up (1934) - Hotel Manager (uncredited)
 Stand Up and Cheer! (1934) - Senator (uncredited)
 Fog Over Frisco (1934) - Accountant (uncredited)
 The Life of Vergie Winters (1934) - Mr. Preston
 I Give My Love (1934) - Attorney (uncredited)
 Name the Woman (1934) - Det. Jeffries
 She Had to Choose (1934) - District Attorney
 Marie Galante (1934) - Head of Bureau in Washington (uncredited)
 Transatlantic Merry-Go-Round (1934) - Ship's Captain (uncredited)
 Cheating Cheaters (1934) - Mr. Palmer
 I'll Fix It (1934) - Cohagen
 The Secret Bride (1934) - Defense Attorney (uncredited)
 Enter Madame (1935) - John H. Massey (uncredited)
 Bordertown (1935) - Friend of Dean on Podium (uncredited)
 The Casino Murder Case (1935) - Dr. Elton (uncredited)
 It Happened in New York (1935) - Joe Blake
 Baby Face Harrington (1935) - Mr. Stokes (uncredited)
 $10 Raise (1935) - President water company (uncredited)
 The Flame Within (1935) - Man at Hospital Benefit (uncredited)
 Chinatown Squad (1935) - Police Lieutenant Norris
 Champagne for Breakfast (1935) - Reach
 Mutiny on the Bounty (1935) - Morrison
 Whipsaw (1935) - Agent Claymore (uncredited)
 White Lies (1935) - Prosecuting Attorney (uncredited)
 Three Live Ghosts (1936) - Detective Harris (uncredited)
 It Had to Happen (1936) - Immigration Officer (uncredited)
 The Return of Jimmy Valentine (1936) - Johnson (uncredited)
 Sutter's Gold (1936) - Defense Attorney (uncredited)
 The Great Ziegfeld (1936) - Stock Broker (uncredited)
 The First Baby (1936) - Williams (uncredited)
 The Unguarded Hour (1936) - Grainger
 Parole! (1936) - Prison Warden
 Easy Money (1936) - Mr. Curtis
 Ticket to Paradise (1936) - Editor (uncredited)
 Postal Inspector (1936) - Inspector Gil Pottle
 Romeo and Juliet (1936) - Town Watch (uncredited)
 Missing Girls (1936) - Senator Benson
 Craig's Wife (1936) - Mr. Burton (uncredited)
 Adventure in Manhattan (1936) - City Editor (uncredited)
 Come Closer, Folks (1936) - Mr. Houston
 Great Guy (1936) - Joel Green
 We Who Are About to Die (1937) - Dr. Hedges (uncredited)
 Woman in Distress (1937) - Mervyn Seymour
 Criminal Lawyer (1937) - Judge - Nora James' Trial (uncredited)
 The Last of Mrs. Cheyney (1937) - George
 I Promise to Pay (1937) - B.G. Wilson
 The Jones Family in Big Business (1937) - Mr. Rodney
 Parnell (1937) - Doctor (uncredited)
 The Wildcatter (1937) - Torrance
 She Had to Eat (1937) - Ralph Wilkinson - G-Man
 The Man Who Cried Wolf (1937) - Resident Doctor (uncredited)
 Escape by Night (1937) - District Attorney Baldwin
 Trapped by G-Men (1937) - Federal Agent #1
 Dangerously Yours (1937) - Insurance Agent (uncredited)
 Big Town Girl (1937) - Garvey (uncredited)
 Rosalie (1937) - Major Prentice (uncredited)
 The Higgins Family (1938) - George W. Bradshaw
 Hunted Men (1938) - Chief of Police (uncredited)
 You Can't Take It with You (1938) - Bill Hughes (uncredited)
 Personal Secretary (1938) - Fleming (uncredited)
 Star Reporter (1939) - District Attorney William Burnette
 Blondie Meets the Boss (1939) - Henry W. Philpot (uncredited)
 I Stole a Million (1939) - Jenkins - Mgr. of Cab Installment Sales (uncredited)
 Smuggled Cargo (1939) - Dr. Hamilton
 Main Street Lawyer (1939) - Reynolds
 Allegheny Uprising (1939) - McGlashan
 Gone with the Wind (1939) - Poker-Playing Captain (uncredited)
 The Big Guy (1939) - District Attorney
 Abe Lincoln in Illinois (1940) - Politician (uncredited)
 Vigil in the Night (1940) - Mr. Peterson - Board Member (uncredited)
 And One Was Beautiful (1940) - Judge (uncredited)
 Young Bill Hickok (1940) - Senator Tucker (uncredited)
 Penny Serenade (1941) - Judge
 Murder by Invitation (1941) - Judge Moore
 Ellery Queen and the Perfect Crime (1941) - Harmon (uncredited)
 Pacific Blackout (1941) - Pompous Doctor (uncredited)
 The Remarkable Andrew (1942) - City Treasurer R.R. McCall
 Hello, Annapolis (1942) - Mr. Nolan (uncredited)
 Yankee Doodle Dandy (1942) - President Theodore Roosevelt (uncredited)
 Tombstone, the Town Too Tough to Die (1942) - Ed Schieffelin
 Gentleman Jim (1942) - Judge Geary (uncredited)
 Random Harvest (1942) - Jones (uncredited)
 The Human Comedy (1943) - School Principal (uncredited)
 Mission to Moscow (1943) - Well-wisher with Bill (uncredited)
 Crime Doctor (1943) - Judge (uncredited)
 Bomber's Moon (1943) - Col. Sir Charles Sanford
 The Man from Down Under (1943) - The Major (uncredited)
 You're a Lucky Fellow, Mr. Smith (1943) - Travers (uncredited)
 Northern Pursuit (1943) - Judge (uncredited)
 Jack London (1943) - Theodore Roosevelt (uncredited)
 The Desert Song (1943) - Pajot (uncredited)
 Uncertain Glory (1944) - Razeau (uncredited)
 The Lady and the Monster (1944) - Warden (uncredited)
 Follow the Boys (1944) - HVC Committee Man (uncredited)
 Mr. Skeffington (1944) - Clubman (uncredited)
 Since You Went Away (1944) - Man at Cocktail Lounge (uncredited)
 Mrs. Parkington (1944) - Capt. McTavish (uncredited)
 National Velvet (1944) - Clerk of Scales (uncredited)
 The Captain from Köpenick (completed in 1941, released in 1945) - Friedrich Hoprecht
 Without Love (1945) - Prof. Thompson (uncredited)
 Conflict (1945) - Prof. Berens (uncredited)
 First Yank Into Tokyo (1945) - Dr. Langley (uncredited)
 Mildred Pierce (1945) - Wally's lawyer (uncredited)
 San Antonio (1945) - Tip Brice (uncredited)
 Devotion (1946) - Mr. George Smith (uncredited)
 That Forsyte Woman (1949) - Cabby (uncredited)
 Free for All (1949) - Mr. Van Alstyne
 The Toast of New Orleans''' (1950) - Mr. O'Neill (uncredited)
 Kim (1950) - British General at Creighton's (uncredited)
 Criminal Lawyer (1951) - Melville Webber (uncredited)
 The Las Vegas Story (1952) - Allan Witwer (uncredited)
 She Couldn't Say No (1952) - Reverend Weaver (uncredited)
 Rogue's March'' (1953) - Brooks - Bill Collector (uncredited)

References

External links 

 
 

1882 births
1961 deaths
Male actors from Essex
English emigrants to the United States
English male film actors
20th-century English male actors